Çolaqlı (also, Çolaxlı, Cholagly, and Cholakhly) is a village in the Shaki District of Azerbaijan. The village forms part of the municipality of Jafarabad.

References 

Populated places in Shaki District